Below is a list of official residences of Australia.

Current official residences

Federal
 Government House, Canberra, residence of the Governor-General of Australia in Canberra
 Admiralty House, Kirribilli, residence of the Governor-General of Australia in Sydney
 The Lodge, Canberra, residence of the Prime Minister of Australia in Canberra
 Kirribilli House, Sydney, residence of the Prime Minister of Australia in Sydney

State and territory
 Government House, Adelaide, residence of the Governor of South Australia
 Government House, Brisbane, residence of the Governor of Queensland
 Government House, Darwin, residence of the Administrator of the Northern Territory
 Government House, Hobart, residence of the Governor of Tasmania
 Government House, Melbourne, residence of the Governor of Victoria
 Government House, Norfolk Island, residence of the Administrator of Norfolk Island
 Government House, Perth, residence of the Governor of Western Australia
 Government House, Sydney, residence of the Governor of New South Wales

Former official residences
 First Government House, Sydney, former residence of the Governor of New South Wales, 1788-1845
 Old Government House, Parramatta, former residence of the Governor of New South Wales, built in 1799
 Cranbrook, Bellevue Hill, former residence of the Governor of New South Wales, 1901–1917
 Old Government House, Queensland, former residence of the Governor of Queensland, 1862–1910
 Old Government House, South Australia, former residence of the Governor of South Australia, 1860–1880
 Old Government House, Hobart, former residence of the Governor of Tasmania
 Toorak House, former residence of the Governor of Victoria, 1854–1876
 Stonington mansion, former residence of the Governor of Victoria, 1901–1931

Summer residences 
 Hillview, Sutton Forest, former summer residence of the Governor of New South Wales, 1885–1957
 Harlaxton House in Toowoomba, former summer residence of the Governor of Queensland
 Fernside in Toowoomba, former summer residence of the Governor of Queensland
 Gabbinar in Toowoomba, former summer residence of the Governor of Queensland
 Marble Hill, South Australia, former summer residence of the Governor of South Australia, 1880–1955

See also
 Government Houses of the Commonwealth

 *
 
Australia
Residences